USS Agawam (SP-570) — later renamed as the USS Natick (SP-570) — was a yacht acquired during World War I by the United States Navy. She was employed by the Navy as a patrol boat in the Great Lakes and was returned to her owner when the war was over.

Construction
USS Agawam was built in England.

Service history
Natick was acquired by the Navy on free lease from Richard T. Crane of Chicago, Illinois on 12 April 1917, then renamed Natick and commissioned on 20 October 1917. She was assigned as a patrol craft in the 9th Naval District during World War I. After wartime patrol duties, she was returned to her owner 15 August 1919.

References

External links
 USS Natick (SP-570), 1917-1919. Originally named Agawam.

World War I auxiliary ships of the United States
Motorboats of the United States Navy
Patrol vessels of the United States
Ships built in England
Motor yachts